The North Division Three was the fifth tier of the Shinty league system before folding in 2015.

External links
Marine Harvest North Division Three

Shinty competitions